Musa Serhoyevych Mahomedov (born 7 April 1970) is a North Caucasian-born Ukrainian entrepreneur and politician currently serving as a People's Deputy of Ukraine from , including the cities of Avdiivka and Yasynuvata and parts of the city of Donetsk, since 2019. He was previously director of the Avdiivka Coke Plant from 2012 to 2019, managing the plant during the height of the War in Donbas.

Early life and business career 

In 2012, Mahomedov became director of the Avdiivka Coke Plant. His tenure was particularly notable for the Battle of Avdiivka during the War in Donbas, after separatists of the Donetsk People's Republic shelled the plant, resulting in a temporary loss of power to the city. Following the battle, he assisted with the reconstruction of Avdiivka, including rebuilding the city's sewage system.

Political career 
A member of the same Opposition Bloc party that Zvyahilsky had been part of prior to his retirement, Mahomedov won the district with 64.6% of the vote. In second place was pro-Russian Opposition Platform — For Life candidate Anastasiia Petrenko, who garnered 14.56% of the vote.

Among the proposals Mahomedov supported during his candidacy were ending the War in Donbas, restoring the Avdiivka City Court, resolving issues of lighting, gas, and water supply in Donetsk Oblast, and creating additional crossing points on the demarcating line between Ukrainian and separatist forces in the Donbas.

On 4 September 2020, Mahomedov was included in the list of Ukrainian individuals against whom sanctions were imposed by the Russian government. 

In February 2021, Mahomedov garnered attention when it was revealed that during a regular meeting of the Verkhovna Rada (Ukraine's parliament), he had been exchanging intimate methods with an individual known as "Oleg Donin." In response to public attention, Mahomedov claimed in a message posted to his Telegram account that it was simply "friendly trolling," and that "Oleg [would] eventually turn out to be Olya." 

Mahomedov, along with Oleksiy Honcharenko, introduced a bill to recognise the Chechen Republic of Ichkeria in July 2022. The bill eventually passed in October 2022, leading to Ukrainian recognition of the Chechen Republic of Ichkeria.

References 

1970 births
Ninth convocation members of the Verkhovna Rada
Opposition Bloc politicians
Living people